The Circle Album Chart, previously known as the Gaon Album Chart, is a record chart ranking the 100 most popular albums, extended plays and single albums in South Korea based on their physical sales. It is a part of the Circle Chart, previously known as the Gaon Chart. It compiles shipments in weekly, monthly, and year-end formats with detailed album sales.

History
The Gaon Album Chart was launched as a part of the Gaon Chart in February 2010 by the Korea Music Content Association and South Korea's Ministry of Culture, Sports and Tourism. 

In February 2011, Gaon Chart published information on both online and offline album sales of 2010, including a detailed breakdown of online chart data, and was the first time that offline album sales were released since 2008 when the Music Industry Association of Korea stopped compiling data.

In July 2022, Gaon Chart was rebranded as Circle Chart with a reformation in the album chart that would also provide weekly physical album sales data in addition to monthly and yearly sales data.

Number-one albums

Best-selling albums

Achievement by artists

See also

References

External links
 Circle Chart homepage 

South Korean record charts